The 2019 Copa CONMEBOL Libertadores Femenina de Futsal was the 6th edition of the Copa Libertadores Femenina de Futsal, South America's premier women's club futsal tournament organized by CONMEBOL. The tournament was held at Balneário Camboriú, Brazil between 1–8 December 2019.

Leões Da Serra were the defending champions, but did not qualify for this edition.

Teams
The competition was contested by 10 teams: one entry from each of the ten CONMEBOL associations.

Venues
The tournament was played at the Ginásio Hamilton Linhares Cruz in Balneário Camboriú.

Draw
The draw of the tournament was held on 20 November 2019, 17:00 BRA (UTC−3), at the headquarters of the Federação Catarinense de Futebol in Balneário Camboriú. The ten teams were drawn into two groups of five. The following two teams were seeded:
Group A: the representative from the host association (Brazil)
Group B: the representative from the association which were the runners-up from the previous edition (Paraguay)

The other teams were seeded based on the results of their association in the 2018 Copa Libertadores Femenina de Futsal. Each group, apart from the seeded team, contained two teams from each of Pot 1 and Pot 2.

Squads

Each team has to submit a squad of 14 players, including a minimum of two goalkeepers.

Group stage
The top two teams of each group advance to the semi-finals.

Tiebreakers
The teams are ranked according to points (3 points for a win, 1 point for a draw, 0 points for a loss). If tied on points, tiebreakers are applied in the following order (Regulations Article 21):
Results in head-to-head matches between tied teams (points, goal difference, goals scored);
Goal difference in all matches;
Goals scored in all matches;
Drawing of lots.

All times are local, BRT (UTC−3).

Group A

Group B

Knockout stage
In the knockout stage, extra time and penalty shoot-out would be used to decide the winner if necessary (no extra time would be used in the play-offs for third to tenth place).

Bracket

Semi-finals

Ninth place play-off

Seventh place play-off

Fifth place play-off

Third place play-off

Final

Final ranking

References

External links
CONMEBOL Libertadores de Futsal Femenino Brasil 2019, CONMEBOL.com

2019
2019 in South American futsal
2019 in Brazilian football
December 2019 sports events in South America
International futsal competitions hosted by Brazil